Nokia 6 can refer to

Nokia 6, an Android smartphone, announced in January 2017
Nokia 6.1, an Android smartphone, announced in January 2018